Tom McCormack may refer to:

 Tom McCormack (Erin's Own hurler) (1888–1959), Irish hurler for Kilkenny and Erin's Own
 Tom McCormack (James Stephens hurler) (born 1953), Irish hurler for Kilkenny and James Stephens
 Tom McCormack (footballer), New Zealand association footballer

See also
 Tom McCormick (disambiguation)